Abacetus azurescens is a species of ground beetle in the subfamily Pterostichinae. It was described by Straneo in 1955 and is found across West Africa.

References

azurescens
Beetles described in 1955
Insects of West Africa